Jan Josef Štursa (15 May 1880 in Nové Město na Moravě – 2 May 1925 in Prague) was a Czech sculptor, one of founders of modern Czech sculpture.

Birth and studies 
Štursa was born in mountainous area of Vysočina Region. He studied masonry and sculpture in Hořice and worked as stone cutter. Later, he studied at the Academy of Arts (AVU) in Prague under professor Josef Myslbek, a known sculptor. As a result of very rigorous criticism from Myslbek, Štursa destroyed most of his early works.

Themes and materials 
Štursa was not influenced by Czech National Revival as the older sculptors but tried to find his own way. The female body was his frequent motif, for example in Before taking bath, 1906  or The Melancholy Girl, 1906. A monumental couple of figures decorates the pylons of Hlávka Bridge in Prague. In addition to stone and bronze he also used plaster and wax. Later, he was influenced by cubism. Portrait painting was an important part of his works.

World War I 

The tragedy of World War I (he had served at the front) affected Štursa's work. The most famous work of this period is The Wounded: early version, final version (1921), more details.

The inspiration for the Burial in the Carpathians sculpture was a photograph from a Carpathian battlefield. The original group in Austrian uniforms was remade in the 1920s into a memorial of victims of World War I and placed in the village Předměřice nad Jizerou, with copies in Místek and in Nové Město na Moravě.

During 1922–1924 Štursa served as Rector of the Academy of Arts (AVU). Štursa suffered from the effects of syphilis and in 1925, faced with increasing pain, he killed himself in his atelier two weeks before his 45th birthday.

Štursa's nephew Jiri Štursa was the architect of Stalin's Monument (Prague).

Works 
 Art nouveau funerary monument for artist Max Horb in the New Jewish Cemetery.

References 

 Petr Wittlich: Sculpture of the Czech Art Nouveau, Prague, Karolinum Press 2001,  (in English, German translation available)
 Jiří Mašín, photos Tibor Honty: "Jan Štursa",  Odeon, Prague, 1981

External links 
 Short biography (in Czech)
 Gallery of several Štursa's sculptures

1880 births
1925 suicides
Czech sculptors
Czech male sculptors
Sculptors who committed suicide
Suicides by firearm in Czechoslovakia
Suicides by firearm in the Czech Republic
Art Nouveau sculptors
People from Nové Město na Moravě
20th-century sculptors
1925 deaths
Sculptors from the Austro-Hungarian Empire